Dave Fogel (born October 2) is an American classic hits radio disc jockey.  He has worked in Chicago, Detroit, Washington D.C., San Diego and Kansas City.  The bulk of his radio work has been in Chicago, and he is the current morning show host on 94.7 WLS-FM.

Early life
Dave was born in Rochester, New York, the son of actor, DJ and talk radio host Jerry Fogel.  At the age of six, Dave moved to Hollywood, CA when his father started working on the TV series "The Mothers-in-Law." (Jerry also starred in "The White Shadow" and had guest roles on numerous other television shows).  Dave attended Granada Hills High School in suburban Los Angeles where he played on the football team with Super Bowl MVP John Elway. He also attended high school with actress Valerie Bertinelli, they were in the same algebra class.

In order to live a more "normal" life, Dave's dad moved the family to Kansas City, where Dave attended the University of Missouri-Columbia and was a member of the Sigma Chi fraternity living in the house then with Brad Pitt.

Sheryl Crow was at Mizzou at the same time, and she gave the guys singing lessons of the Sweetheart of Sigma Chi.

While in college, Dave got into the radio biz, first at KJMO-FM in Jefferson City, MO as overnight DJ, and then moving to KCMQ-FM (Columbia, MO) as the night time DJ.

Radio career
After earning a Bachelor of Arts degree, Dave's next stop was for the night show at KJLA-AM an all disco station in Kansas City, MO. Top rated KBEQ-FM (Kansas City) came calling next where he worked as the overnight DJ.

In 1985, Dave headed west to KSDO-FM in San Diego for three years of night disc-jockey work.  Dave's next stop was WAVA-FM in Washington DC also for the night show.  Dave was then hired away in 1989 as the afternoon drive DJ on WHYT-FM Detroit, MI and he spent seven very successful years there, where he also started his family.

Dave landed in the Windy City of Chicago in 1996, replacing former child star Danny Bonaduce on WLUP-FM.  He then moved down the dial to WTMX-FM, where he spent almost eight years as a top rated afternoon personality on "101.9 The Mix." 

After his contract expired in 2004, Dave headed back to Kansas City to KMXV-FM as midday host before eventually moving to morning drive at sister station, KCKC-FM.  He was on the morning show there for three years before returning to Chicago to host mornings at WLS-FM in 2010, replacing former morning man (and current WMAQ TV weatherman) Brant Miller. Fogel was morning host at WLS for nearly three years before eventually being replaced by the man he displaced, Brant Miller. 

Dave Fogel was immediately picked up by WJMK-FM in Chicago where he eventually moved into the morning slot, superseding longtime market veterans Eddie and Jobo.

After five years at "K-Hits", CBS Radio sold the station and the format flipped to Hip-hop.  Dave was released in November 2017 and was quickly signed by WLS-FM once again.  For the second time, Dave would replace Brant Miller at WLS-FM.

In March of 2018, Dave began doing the midday show on KCMO-FM in Kansas City.  It's a sister station of WLS-AM/FM and he does the show from their studios in Chicago.

Cancer Scare
In February 2017 Dave revealed to his radio audience that he was diagnosed with Prostate Cancer.  He missed just one day of work on the air (surgery day), as he did his morning show broadcast from his home for the next three weeks. Fogel maintained that the PSA blood test saved his life, and has emphasized awareness since his diagnosis.  Later tests revealed that the surgery was not a complete success for Dave and radiation treatments became necessary.

Personal life
Fogel is married to his college sweetheart (Melanie) since August of 1985 and they have two children.

References

Living people
1960 births
American radio personalities
Granada Hills Charter High School alumni